The 1999 Asian Women's Handball Championship was the seventh Asian Championship, which was taking place from 24 to 30 January 2000 in Kumamoto, Japan. It acted as the Asian qualifying tournament for the 2000 Olympic Games.

Standings

Results
All times are local (UTC+9).

Final standing

References
Results

External links
www.handball.jp

Asian
International handball competitions hosted by Japan
Asian Handball Championships
Asian Handball
January 2000 sports events in Asia